David Cheap was an officer in the Royal Navy.

He is known for two incidents in his career.  He commanded  when it was wrecked on the shores of the deep south of Chile, after transiting the stormy Straits of Magellan, in 1741; and his capture of a rich prize, in 1746, which made him a rich man.

Spain and Great Britain were at war in 1739. Cheap, then just a lieutenant, was appointed to serve under Commodore George Anson, commander of an expedition to the Pacific Ocean.  The original captain of Wager died, at sea, while the expedition was still navigating South Atlantic. Anson gave Cheap acting command of the vessel.

Cheap's management of Wager, prior to the wreck, and his attempts to manage his former crew, after the wreck, continue to be discussed to the present day. Cheap had been an unpopular commander, and, after the ship was wrecked, most of his crew would not follow his instructions. Officer's commissions, at the time, only appointed them to command ships. Seamen's pay ended when a ship was sunk. His former crew thought his formal authority over them ended when the ship was sunk. Most of the surviving crew attempted to sail to safety in the ship's longboat, the Speedwell, under the command of the ship's former gunner, John Bulkeley. Cheap and three of his former officers were captured by Spanish authorities, and arrived back in Britain years after Bulkeley, and after Bulkeley had published an account of the voyage that showed Cheap in a poor light.

References

Royal Navy officers